The Bila River is a river in northern Sumatra, Indonesia, about 1200 km northwest of the capital Jakarta. It is a tributary of the Barumun River.

Geography
The river flows in the southwest area of Java with predominantly tropical rainforest climate (designated as Af in the Köppen-Geiger climate classification). The annual average temperature in the area is 24 °C. The warmest month is August, when the average temperature is around 26 °C, and the coldest is January, at 23 °C. The average annual rainfall is 3766 mm. The wettest month is November, with an average of 381 mm rainfall, and the driest is March, with 126 mm rainfall.

See also
List of rivers of Indonesia
List of rivers of Sumatra

References

Rivers of North Sumatra
Rivers of Indonesia